The 1975 World Table Tennis Championships mixed doubles was the 33rd edition of the mixed doubles championship.  

Stanislav Gomozkov and Tatiana Ferdman defeated Sarkis Sarchayan and Elmira Antonyan in the final by three sets to one.

Results

See also
List of World Table Tennis Championships medalists

References

-